Kushk-e Mowla (also Romanized as Kūshk-e Mowlā and Kushk-i-Maula) is a village in Darian Rural District, in the Central District of Shiraz County, Fars Province, Iran. At the 2006 census, its population was 930, in 235 families.

References 

Populated places in Shiraz County